is a passenger railway station located in the city of  Katsuura, Chiba Prefecture, Japan operated by the East Japan Railway Company (JR East).

Lines

Station Layout
Katsuura Station consists of two island platforms serving three tracks. Track 1 is used for bidirectional traffic. The station has a Midori no Madoguchi staffed ticket office.

Platform

History
Katsuura Station was opened on 20 June 1913. The current elevated station building was completed on 1 July 1982. Katsuura Station was absorbed into the JR East network upon the privatization of the Japan National Railways (JNR) on 1 April 1987.

Passenger statistics
In fiscal 2019, the station was used by an average of 946 passengers daily (boarding passengers only).

Surrounding area
 Morning market (朝市)
 Katsuura fishing port
 International Budo University

See also
 List of railway stations in Japan

References

External links

 Katsuura Station 

Railway stations in Japan opened in 1913
Railway stations in Chiba Prefecture
Sotobō Line
Katsuura, Chiba